Tephritis tridentata is a species of tephritid or fruit flies in the genus Tephritis of the family Tephritidae.

Distribution
Turkmenistan, Kazakhstan, and Iran.

References

Tephritinae
Insects described in 2013
Diptera of Asia